The Patriarchal system  was an important political system in the Western Zhou. The patriarchal system was based on blood relations, with firstborn succession at its core, and played a role in maintaining the Western Zhou political hierarchy and stabilizing social order. Together with the ritual and music system it is seen as having been the foundation of Zhou society

Overview 
The Zhou people had the custom of building Jongmyo early on, and the clan temple housed a Spirit tablet representing the ancestor, and the number of "temples" built inside depended on the hierarchical status of the patriarch. In addition to rituals, the temples were also used for major ceremonies and decisions, and had the character of a ceremonial hall. This respect for the ancestors strengthened the unity within the clan and stabilized the social structure. Complementing the clan temple system was the clan tomb system, in which nobles and state officials were buried en masse in public cemeteries during the Western Zhou and Spring and Autumn periods. According to the three books of rites, all clansmen should be buried in the clan tomb, except for the murderous dead. The patriarch sometimes had to go to the clan tomb to report the ancestors when there was an urgent matter.

In the Western Zhou Dynasty, "" and "Shi" were two concepts, with "" indicating descent and "Shi" being a branch of "".  The nobles were given a "given name" by their fathers when they were young, and "Courtesy name" when they were adults. The "Courtesy name" is taken at the "Crown Ceremony" or "Maturity Ceremony", or sometimes at marriage for women. For men, there are three characters in the full name of the character: the first character indicates the lineage of the eldest and youngest (伯、仲、叔、季, etc.), the second character is arbitrary, and the last character is the character for "father". This is similar to cadency in Western heraldry

Similar to the clan society, the nobles of the Zhou dynasty forbade Same-surname marriage..

See Also 

 Veneration of the dead
 Fengjian
 Ritual and music system
Cadency
 Ancestor veneration in China

References 

Family history
Ancient institutions in East Asia
Ancient Chinese institutions
Chinese clans